39th BSFC Awards
December 16, 2018

Best Film: 
If Beale Street Could Talk

The 39th Boston Society of Film Critics Awards, honoring the best in filmmaking in 2018, were given on December 16, 2018.

Winners

 Best Film:
 If Beale Street Could Talk
 Runner-up: Shoplifters
 Best Director:
 Lynne Ramsay – You Were Never Really Here
 Runner-up: Yorgos Lanthimos – The Favourite
 Best Actor:
 John C. Reilly – Stan & Ollie
 Runner-up: Ethan Hawke – First Reformed
 Best Actress:
 Melissa McCarthy – Can You Ever Forgive Me?
 Runner-up: Sakura Ando – Shoplifters
 Best Supporting Actor:
 Richard E. Grant – Can You Ever Forgive Me?
 Runner-up: Brian Tyree Henry – If Beale Street Could Talk
 Runner-up: Steven Yeun – Burning
 Best Supporting Actress:
 Regina King – If Beale Street Could Talk
 Runner-up: J. Smith-Cameron – Nancy
 Best Screenplay:
 Nicole Holofcener and Jeff Whitty – Can You Ever Forgive Me?
 Runner-up: Tamara Jenkins – Private Life
 Best Original Score:
 Nicholas Britell – If Beale Street Could Talk
 Runner-up: Justin Hurwitz – First Man
 Runner-up: Jonny Greenwood – You Were Never Really Here
 Best Animated Film:
 Isle of Dogs
 Runner-up: Ralph Breaks the Internet
 Best Foreign Language Film:
 Shoplifters
 Runner-up: Cold War
 Best Documentary:
 Won't You Be My Neighbor?
 Runner-up: Three Identical Strangers
 Best Cinematography:
 Alfonso Cuarón – Roma
 Runner-up: Łukasz Żal – Cold War
 Best Editing:
 Tom Cross – First Man
 Runner-up: Bob Murawski and Orson Welles – The Other Side of the Wind
 Best New Filmmaker:
 Bo Burnham – Eighth Grade
 Runner-up: Ari Aster – Hereditary
 Best Ensemble:
 Shoplifters
 Runner-up: The Favourite

References

External links
 Official website

2018
2018 film awards
2018 awards in the United States
2018 in Boston
December 2018 events in the United States